The following radio stations broadcast on FM frequency 98.7 MHz:

Argentina
 Cristal in Olavarría, Buenos Aires
 Cóndor in Villa de Merlo, San Luis
 Del Mar in Comodoro Rivadavia, Chubut
 Imperio in Río Cuarto, Córdoba
 Estación K2 in Necochea, Buenos Aires
 Las Rosas in Las Rosas, Santa Fe
 LaRock-a in San Carlos de Bariloche, Río Negro
 LIF in General Arenales, Buenos Aires
 Magica Miramar in Miramar, Buenos Aires
 Metro TDF in Río Grande, Tierra del Fuego
 Municipal in Patquia, La Rioja
 Nacional Folklórica in Buenos Aires
 Tango in Rosario, Santa Fe
 ToP! Radio in Camilo Aldao, Córdoba
 Universidad in Posadas, Misiones
 Universo in San Antonio de Arredondo, Córdoba
 VOX in Tres Arroyos, Buenos Aires
 Z98 Radio Laprida in Laprida, Buenos Aires

Australia
 ABC Classic FM in Port Macquarie, New South Wales
 SBS Radio in Young, New South Wales
 4RGM in Mackay, Queensland
 Ten FM in Stanthorpe, Queensland
 5EZY in Renmark, South Australia
 3RPP in Melbourne, Victoria
 Radio National in Orbost, Victoria
 SBS Radio in Mildura, Victoria
 Triple J in Kalgoorlie, Western Australia

Canada (Channel 254)
 CBCB-FM in Owen Sound, Ontario
 CBCP-FM in Peterborough, Ontario
 CBQX-FM in Kenora, Ontario
 CBYM-FM in Mt. St. Margaret, Newfoundland and Labrador
 CBYN-FM in Nelson, British Columbia
 CHFB-FM in Bonnyville, Alberta
 CHGR-FM in Grand Rapids, Manitoba
 CHWN-FM in Skownan, Manitoba
 CICF-4-FM in Enderby, British Columbia
 CICV-FM in Cowichan Lake, British Columbia
 CIKI-FM in Rimouski, Quebec
 CJHR-FM in Renfrew, Ontario
 CKFG-FM in Toronto, Ontario
 CKNR-FM-1 in Elliot Lake, Ontario
 CKPM-FM in Port Moody, British Columbia
 CKRW-FM-1 in Atlin, British Columbia
 CKRW-FM-2 in Inuvik, Northwest Territories
 CKXD-FM in Gander, Newfoundland and Labrador
 VF2063 in Faro, Yukon
 VF2098 in Riley Creek, British Columbia
 VF2143 in Watson Lake, Yukon
 VF2148 in Mayo Road, Yukon
 VF2266 in Carcross, Yukon
 VF2267 in Carmacks, Yukon
 VF2268 in Mayo, Yukon
 VF2269 in Haines Junction, Yukon
 VF2270 in Teslin, Yukon
 VF2297 in Parson, British Columbia
 VF2388 in Ekati Mine Site, Northwest Territories

Indonesia
 GEN FM in Jakarta

Malaysia
 TraXX FM in Kedah, Perlis dan Penang

Mexico
 XHAB-FM in Santa Ana, Sonora
 XHBAK-FM in Chilón, Chiapas
 XHCORO-FM in Loma Bonita, Oaxaca
 XHCPBS-FM in Nacajuca, Tabasco
 XHEMY-FM in Ciudad Mante, Tamaulipas
 XHEOJ-FM in Lázaro Cárdenas, Michoacán
 XHFRC-FM in Monclova, Coahuila
 XHLC-FM in Guadalajara, Jalisco
 XHMQ-FM in Querétaro, Querétaro
 XHOZA-FM in Zaragoza, Coahuila
 XHPBA-FM in Puebla, Puebla
 XHPOR-FM in Putla de Guerrero, Oaxaca
 XHPRIO-FM in Río Grande, Zacatecas
 XHTAP-FM in Tapachula, Chiapas
 XHUAL-FM in Torreón, Coahuila
 XHVOX-FM in Mazatlán, Sinaloa

Philippines
 DYFR in Cebu City
 DZFE in Pasig
 DWUB in Baguio
 DXFH in Zamboanga City
 DXQM in Davao City

Singapore
 987FM

South Korea
 GFN (FM) in Gwangju
 KBS Happy FM in Chuncheon, Gangwon Province
 MBC FM4U in Ulsan

Trinidad & Tobago
BBC World Service at Port-of-Spain, & Scarborough

United States (Channel 254)
 KACL in Bismarck, North Dakota
  in Nyssa, Oregon
 KAVB (FM) in Hawthorne, Nevada
 KAWR in Reliance, Wyoming
  in Salt Lake City, Utah
 KBNM-LP in Belen, New Mexico
 KDIV-LP in Fayetteville, Arkansas
 KELI (FM) in San Angelo, Texas
 KFXP-LP in Wenatchee, Washington
 KGPS-LP in Kingman, Arizona
 KHKM in Hamilton, Montana
 KHWL in Lone Wolf, Oklahoma
 KISD (FM) in Pipestone, Minnesota
  in Oakdale, Louisiana
  in Winton, California
  in Moorhead, Minnesota
 KLUV in Dallas, Texas
  in Centerville, Iowa
 KMLK in El Dorado, Arkansas
  in Mabton, Washington
 KMTH (FM) in Maljamar, New Mexico
 KMVP-FM in Phoenix, Arizona
  in Clearwater, Kansas
 KNVU-LP in Victorville, California
 KOTC-LP in Jefferson City, Missouri
 KOTX in Hebbronville, Texas
  in Rapid City, South Dakota
 KPRF in Amarillo, Texas
 KRQU in Laramie, Wyoming
  in Afton, Wyoming
  in Cortez, Colorado
 KSGZ in Greenfield, California
 KSID-FM in Sidney, Nebraska
 KSMA-FM in Osage, Iowa
 KSNM in Truth or Consequence, New Mexico
 KTXN-FM in Victoria, Texas
 KTXR in Springfield, Missouri
  in La Grande, Oregon
 KUPL in Portland, Oregon
 KWPB-LP in Newport, Oregon
 KWXL-LP in Tucson, Arizona
  in Hamilton, Montana
 KXTS (FM) in Geyserville, California
 KYOA in Kiowa, Oklahoma
 KYSR in Los Angeles, California
  in Coos Bay, Oregon
 KZAM (FM) in Pleasant Valley, Texas
 WAKX in Palm Coast, Florida
  in Battle Ground, Indiana
 WBHK in Warrior, Alabama
  in Homerville, Georgia
  in Somersworth, New Hampshire
  in Key West, Florida
  in Villas, New Jersey
  in Detroit, Michigan
 WEPN-FM in New York, New York
 WESZ-LP in Abbeville, Alabama
  in Grand Rapids, Michigan
 WFMT in Chicago, Illinois
  in Hancock, Michigan
 WGZO-LP in Bloomfield, Connecticut
 WHMG-LP in Purgitsville, West Virginia
  in Hopkinsville, Kentucky
 WINQ-FM in Winchester, New Hampshire
  in Americus, Georgia
  in Vicksburg, Mississippi
  in Liberty, Kentucky
 WKFY in East Harwich, Massachusetts
  in Wellington, Florida
 WLCD-LP in Jackson, Tennessee
 WLCZ in Lincolnton, Georgia
 WLDN in Ludington, Michigan
 WLEJ-FM in Pleasant Gap, Pennsylvania
 WLFQ-LP in Elkhart, Indiana
  in Utica, New York
  in Mayville, Wisconsin
 WMOF-LP in Live Oak, Florida
  in Washington, District of Columbia
 WNEV in Friar's Point, Mississippi
  in East Lyme, Connecticut
 WNNS in Springfield, Illinois
 WNOR in Norfolk, Virginia
 WNVE in Culebra, Puerto Rico
  in Oliver Springs, Tennessee
 WOVK in Wheeling, West Virginia
 WPAC in Ogdensburg, New York
 WPBB in Holmes Beach, Florida
 WPCZ-LP in Demorest, Georgia
 WPHD in Corning, New York
 WPSI-LP in Miami, Florida
  in Anderson, Indiana
 WRMR in Jacksonville, North Carolina
 WRVZ in Pocatalico, West Virginia
 WSDA-LP in Trenton, Georgia
  in Greensboro, North Carolina
 WUKQ-FM in Mayaguez, Puerto Rico
 WVMO-LP in Monona, Wisconsin
  in Pensacola, Florida
  in Crestline, Ohio
 WYKZ in Beaufort, South Carolina
  in Mcarthur, Ohio

References

Lists of radio stations by frequency